Aleksandar Martinović (born 15 June 1976) is a Serbian lawyer and politician serving as minister of public administration and local self-government since 2022. A member of the Serbian Progressive Party (SNS), he led its parliamentary caucus from 2016 to 2022.

As a member of the far-right Serbian Radical Party (SRS), he served in the SRS parliamentary group from 2007 to 2012, after which he joined SNS.

Early life and career
Martinović was born in Slavonski Brod, in what was then the Socialist Republic of Croatia in the Socialist Federal Republic of Yugoslavia. He graduated from the University of Novi Sad's law faculty in 1999 and subsequently received a master's degree (2003) and a doctorate (2011) from the same institution. He has been employed by the faculty since 2001, working in the field of constitutional law. He now lives in Ruma, in southwestern Vojvodina.

Politician

Radical Party parliamentarian
Martinović received the seventy-fifth position on the Radical Party's electoral list in the 2007 Serbian parliamentary election. The party won eighty-one seats, retaining its status as the largest party in the assembly but also falling well short of a majority and serving in opposition for the sitting of the assembly that followed. Martinović was selected as party of his party's delegation. (From 2000 to 2011, Serbian parliamentary mandates were awarded to sponsoring parties or coalitions rather than to individual candidates, and it was common practice for mandates to be awarded out of numerical order. Martinović did not automatically receive a mandate by virtue of his list position.) He was promoted to the twenty-third position on the Radical list for the 2008 parliamentary election and was once again selected for the party's delegation when the list won seventy-eight seats. The party remained in opposition during this time.

The Radicals experienced a serious split in late 2008, with several members joining the breakaway Progressive Party under the leadership of Tomislav Nikolić and Aleksandar Vučić. Martinović remained with the Radicals and was given a more prominent role within the party. He strongly opposed a late 2008 draft of Vojvodina's statute, describing it as having been designed to "suppress the Serbian identity" of the province and as having "a preamble which is characteristic of a constitution of an independent state." The following year, he opposed an anti-discrimination bill that offered protection to LGBTQ citizens, charging that it amounted to a "persecution of Christians."

Martinović subsequently became deputy leader of the Radical Party's parliamentary group, and some journalists noted that group leader Dragan Todorović was gradually giving him a larger role in the assembly. He travelled to the Netherlands in late 2009 for his first meeting with Radical Party leader Vojislav Šešelj, who was then facing war crimes charges at the International Criminal Tribunal for the Former Yugoslavia in The Hague; in an interview prior to the meeting, Martinović acknowledged that he had risen to the top of the party hierarchy in a relatively short period of time.

Martinović was appointed as vice-president of the Radical Party in April 2010. Later in the year, he called on the government of Serbia to reject any direct negotiations with Hashim Thaçi, the prime minister of the disputed territory of Kosovo, on the grounds that it would confer legitimacy on Thaci's government.

In 2011, he said that the Radical Party could not form government on its own and should join a coalition with the Democratic Party, the Democratic Party of Serbia, or the Socialist Party of Serbia. Todorović declined to comment on this statement.

Serbia's electoral system was reformed in 2011, such that parliamentary mandates were awarded in numerical order to candidates on successful lists. Martinović received the second position on the Radical Party list, behind Šešelj, in the 2012 Serbian parliamentary election. The Radicals also intended to nominate Martinović as their candidate in the 2012 Serbian presidential election, until Šešelj unexpectedly selected his wife Jadranka for the role. Ultimately, the party failed to cross the electoral threshold to win representation in the assembly; Martinović, like all incumbent Radicals seeking re-election, was defeated. The Progressive Party and its allies won the greatest number of seats and subsequently formed a new coalition government with the Socialists and other parties.

Martinović, increasingly dissatisfied with the direction of the Radicals, left the party to join the Progressives on 4 July 2012. He was appointed as the chair of Serbia's privatization agency and of the Galenika supervisory board in 2013, holding both positions until his return to parliament the following year.

Progressive Party parliamentarian
Martinović received the nineteenth position on the Progressive Party's Aleksandar Vučić — Future We Believe In list in the 2014 election and was re-elected when the list won a landslide victory with 158 out of 250 mandates. He chaired the assembly committee on legislative and constitutional issues in the parliament that followed, served as vice-president of the Progressive Party's parliamentary group, and endorsed a new Vojvodina statute that affirmed both the province's autonomy and its inseparability from Serbia. He was promoted to the seventh position on the Progressive list in the 2016 election and was again returned when the list won 131 mandates. Martinović spoke in support of Ana Brnabić, Vučić's successor as prime minister of Serbia, in June 2017, arguing that she would continue a path of integration with the European Union while also seeking stronger connections with Russia and China.

Martinović served as leader of the Progressive Party's parliamentary group in the 2016–20 parliament. He was also chair of the committee on administrative, mandate, budget, and immunity issues; a member of the committee on the judiciary, public administration, and local self-government; the head of the parliamentary friendship group with Bosnia and Herzegovina; and a member of the parliamentary friendship group with Russia.

On 19 July 2018, while speaking in favour of a proposed new law on organ transplantation, he remarked that "once a person dies, he (or she) is no longer owner of properties, nor his body organs".

Martinović and fellow Progressive Party parliamentarian Sandra Božić went on a two-day hunger strike in May 2020, to protest the inaction of Serbia's prosecution and judiciary against what they described as the violent behaviour of Dveri leader Boško Obradović. The strike ended after President Aleksandar Vučić urged the parliamentarians to call it off.

He received the twentieth position on the Progressive Party's Aleksandar Vučić — For Our Children list in the 2020 Serbian parliamentary election and was re-elected to another term when the list won a landslide majority. He now serves as the head of the Aleksandar Vučić — For Our Children parliamentary group (which is dominated by the Progressive Party). Martinović continues to chair of the administrative committee, serve on the judiciary committee, and lead the friendship group with Bosnia and Herzegovina.

Municipal and provincial politics
Martinović served several terms in the Ruma municipal assembly, originally as a member of the Radical Party and later with the Progressives. He was president of the assembly from 26 November 2013 to 10 June 2016. In the 2016 local elections, he was the lead candidate on the Progressive Party's electoral list; the list won a majority victory with twenty-six out forty-three mandates. He did not seek re-election in 2020.

He sought election to the Assembly of Vojvodina in the 2012 provincial election. He was not successful, finishing third in the single-member Ruma constituency.

Electoral record

Provincial (Vojvodina)

References

1976 births
Living people
People from Slavonski Brod
People from Ruma
Serbs of Croatia
Members of the National Assembly (Serbia)
Serbian Radical Party politicians
Serbian Progressive Party politicians